Theodorus "Theo" Heemskerk (20 July 1852 – 12 June 1932) was a Dutch politician of the Anti-Revolutionary Party (ARP)  who served as Prime Minister of the Netherlands from 12 February 1908 until 29 August 1913.

Heemskerk is particularly known as the founder of the Dutch poverty and vaccination laws. His father Jan Heemskerk also served as Prime Minister of the Netherlands.

Decorations

References

External links

Official
  Mr. Th. (Theo) Heemskerk Parlement & Politiek

1852 births
1932 deaths
Anti-Revolutionary Party politicians
Commanders of the Order of the Netherlands Lion
Delft University of Technology alumni
Dutch jurists
Knights Grand Cross of the Order of Orange-Nassau
Leiden University alumni
Members of the Council of State (Netherlands)
Members of the House of Representatives (Netherlands)
Members of the Provincial Council of North Holland
Ministers of Colonial Affairs of the Netherlands
Ministers of the Interior of the Netherlands
Ministers of Justice of the Netherlands
Ministers of State (Netherlands)
Municipal councillors of Amsterdam
Politicians from Utrecht (city)
Prime Ministers of the Netherlands
Reformed Churches Christians from the Netherlands
19th-century Dutch civil servants
19th-century Dutch lawyers
19th-century Dutch politicians
20th-century Dutch civil servants
20th-century Dutch lawyers
20th-century Dutch politicians